Martin Strempfl (born 1 August 1984) is an Austrian sport shooter. He qualified to represent Austria at the 2020 Summer Olympics in Tokyo 2021, competing in men's 10 metre air rifle and finishing 13th.

References

 

1984 births
Living people
Austrian male sport shooters
Shooters at the 2020 Summer Olympics
Olympic shooters of Austria
Sportspeople from Graz
21st-century Austrian people